Daniela Bascopé (born Daniela Bascopé Van Grieken on 11 April 1982) is an American born Venezuelan actress and singer known for her roles in various telenovelas and films.

Biography
Daniela began her career in the performing arts world with a theater group called Acto Anónimo. At the age of 15, she made her first television debut in the telenovela Samantha.

In 2007, Daniela was diagnosed with lymph cancer. After a hard process of recovery, she released a book titled VENCER Y VIVIR detailing her struggle with cancer. the book was published by  Santillana publishing and became a best-seller in Venezuela.

In 2010, Bascopé got her first protagonist role in the telenovela Harina de Otro Costal.

In 2011, she obtained the second starring role of her career in the telenovela El árbol de Gabriel produced by Venevisión. In the same year, she released her first music album titled Ven that featured a combination of musical styles such as bossa nova, techno and world music.

In 2013, she was cast as Corina Montoya in the RTI-Televisa-RCTV production Las Bandidas.

She released her second album titled Tengo Remedio in April 2013.

Filmography

Discography
 Ven (2011)
 Tango Remedio (2013)

References

External links
 

Living people
1982 births
American people of Venezuelan descent
American telenovela actresses
People with acquired Venezuelan citizenship
Venezuelan stage actresses
Venezuelan telenovela actresses
Venezuelan film actresses
20th-century Venezuelan actresses
21st-century Venezuelan actresses
21st-century American women